Positive mental attitude (PMA) is a concept first introduced in 1937 by Napoleon Hill in the book Think and Grow Rich.  The book never actually uses the term, but discusses the importance of positive thinking as a contributing factor of success.  Napoleon, who along with W. Clement Stone, founder of Combined Insurance, later wrote Success Through a Positive Mental Attitude, defines positive mental attitude as comprising the 'plus' characteristics represented by words as faith, integrity, hope, optimism, courage, initiative, generosity, tolerance, tact, kindliness and good common sense.

Positive mental attitude is that philosophy which asserts that having an optimistic disposition in every situation in one's life attracts positive changes and increases achievement. Adherents employ a state of mind that continues to seek, find and execute ways to win, or find a desirable outcome, regardless of the circumstances.  This concept is the opposite of negativity, defeatism and hopelessness. Optimism and hope are vital to the development of PMA.

Positive mental attitude (PMA) is the philosophy of finding greater joy in small joys, to live without hesitation or holding back our most cherished, held in high esteem, and highest personal virtues and values.

Psychology
PMA is under the umbrella of positive psychology.  In positive psychology, high self-efficacy can help in gaining learned optimism which ultimately leads to PMA.  PMA is considered an internal focus of control that influences external factors.  Research has shown that through emotional intelligence training and positive psychology therapy, a person's attitudes and perceptions can be modified to improve one's personal and professional life.

Sports
A study of Major League Baseball players indicated that a key component that separates major league players from the minor leagues and all other levels is their ability to develop mental characteristics and mental skills.  Among them were mental toughness, confidence, maintaining a positive attitude, dealing with failure, expectations, and positive self-talk.

Health
Well-meaning friends in the US and similar cultures routinely encourage people with cancer to maintain a positive attitude.  However, although a positive attitude confers some immediate advantages and is more comfortable for other people, it does not result in a greater chance of cure or longer survival times.

A study done with HIV-positive individuals found that a high health self-efficacy, a task-oriented coping style, and a positive mental attitude were strong predictors for a health-promoting lifestyle which has a significant effect on overall health (coping and surviving).

See also 
 Creative thinking
 Creative Visualization (New Age)
 Law of attraction
 New Thought
 Self-fulfilling prophecy
 Self-help

References

 
Personality